Procambarus horsti, known as the Big Blue Spring crayfish or Big Blue Spring cave crayfish, is a species of crayfish in the family Cambaridae. It is endemic to subterranean springs in Jefferson County and Leon County, Florida.

References

Cambaridae
Endemic fauna of Florida
Freshwater crustaceans of North America
Cave crayfish
Taxonomy articles created by Polbot
Crustaceans described in 1972
Taxa named by Horton H. Hobbs Jr.